The 2019 SLFA First Division was the 41st season of the SLFA First Division, the top-tier football in Saint Lucia. The season started on 17 February and concluded on 28 April 2019. The main venue for the league was the 1,000-capacity Philip Marcellin Grounds.

League table

Stadiums

Top scorers

See also 
 2019 Blackheart/Kashif & Shanghai International Football Tournament, played from 14 September to 5 October 2019
 2019 SLFA Island Cup, played from 2 July to 21 December 2019
 2019 SLFA Second Division
 2019 Babonneau Football League
 2019 Mabouya Valley Football League
 2019 Marchand Football League

References

SLFA First Division
Saint Lucia
1